is a railway station on the Kintetsu Kashihara Line in Ninokuchi, Kashihara, Nara, Japan.

Services 
Ninokuchi serves a single line on the  Kintetsu Railway, the  Kashihara Line.

There are two platforms, Platform 1 goes south to Yamato-Yagi, and Platform 2 goes north to Kasanui.

History
 1923—Ninokuchi Station was opened by the Osaka Electric Tramway as the Unebi Line was extended from Hirahata to Kashiharajingu-mae Station.
 1941—Owned by the Kansai Express Railway that merged with the Sangu Express Railway.
 1944—Owned by the Kintetsu Railway that merged with the Nankai Railway, the station was renamed as Kinki-Nippon Tawaramoto Station.
 Apr. 29, 2003—The underground station facilities were completed。
 Apr. 1, 2007—PiTaPa, a reusable contactless stored value smart card, has been available.

References

External links
 

Railway stations in Nara Prefecture